The 40-Mile Loop is a partially completed greenway trail around and through Portland in the U.S. state of Oregon.  It was proposed in 1903 by the Olmsted Brothers architecture firm as part of the development of Forest Park.
One greenway expert calls it "one of the most creative and resourceful greenway projects in the country."

The name's "forty" was obsolete within a few decades after it was proposed. Similarly, "loop" is not entirely accurate. There are several subloops, cutoffs and spur trails within the system. One spur is proposed to connect to the Pacific Crest Trail.

History 

As part of beautification planning for the Lewis and Clark Centennial Exposition of 1905, Portland's recently established Parks Board invited the Olmsted Brothers in 1903.  Besides suggestions for Washington Park, their research of existing city parks resulted in a bold proposal for a loop of interconnected parks around the city, instead of a traditional plan of scattered parks: "A connected system of parks and parkways is manifestly far more complete and useful than a series of isolated parks."  As the brothers puzzled over a name for the system, one asked the other "What would you call a forty-mile loop?"  The firm was famous for its straightforward names, so they left it at that.

Little action occurred until a $1 million—equivalent to $ today—city bond measure in 1907 passed, which was used to develop existing parks.  In 1912, another city planner, Edward H. Bennett, also recommended developing a ridgetop park long the West Hills.  A $2 million bond issue to acquire the necessary land was voted down.  However, shortly afterward, most of the lots sold in Forest Park forfeited to the city or Multnomah County due to high assessments for road building, and a landslide.

In 1943, influential urban planner Robert Moses was hired, and recommended establishing Forest Park.  After several subsequent years of controversy, the park was created in 1948 from tax-delinquent lands, gifts, and purchases.  This contained the first portion of the  loop.

Little more happened until 1978:  at the request of Oregon legislators, U.S. Congress stripped the Columbia Slough of its "navigable" status, enabling the land to be dedicated to recreational use, an important component of the Olmsted plan.  The Oregon director of the Nature Conservancy responded to withering federal funds for parks and natural areas by reviving the loop plan to enthusiastic receptions by the City, suburban cities, federal agencies, conservationists, and civic groups.  The alliance eventually formed the 40-Mile Loop Land Trust which proved most effective at getting the thirteen key governmental entities—which normally did not talk to each other—to effectively work together.  It also served as an intermediary to transfer property from one entity to the other.

One of the Land Trust's major victories was bringing Southern Pacific and Union Pacific railroads together, which jointly owned the abandoned Springwater Corridor, to transfer the land in 1990 to the Trust.  It represented significant progress in the completion of the loop.

Trail 
The trail has a variety of sections:  some are on level ground, such as along the Columbia River; others are heavily forested and/or mountainous, as through Washington Park's Hoyt Arboretum.  All portions are suitable for walking and hiking, and most are open to bicycling.  There are opportunities for strollers, wheelchairs, skating, skateboarding, horseback riding, canoeing, and kayaking.

Route highlights

 St. Johns Bridge
 Kelley Point Park
 N. and NE Marine Drive along the south bank of the Columbia River
 Smith and Bybee Wetlands Natural Area
 Columbia Slough
 Blue Lake Park
 Troutdale, Oregon
 Mount Hood Community College
 Gresham, Oregon
 Springwater Corridor
 Gresham Main City Park
 Gresham Butte
 Powell Butte Nature Park
 Leach Botanical Garden
 Tideman Johnson Natural Area
 Sellwood Park
 Sellwood Riverfront Park
 Oaks Amusement Park
 Oaks Bottom Wildlife Refuge
 Eastbank Esplanade
 Hawthorne Bridge
 Steel Bridge
 I-205 Bike Path
 Sellwood Bridge
 Willamette Greenway
 Willamette Park
 South Waterfront
 Wildwood Trail
 Washington Park
 World Forestry Center
 Oregon Vietnam Veterans Memorial
 Hoyt Arboretum
 Pittock Mansion
 Forest Park
 Audubon Society of Portland

Future 
The 40-Mile Loop spur Springwater Corridor radiates eastward through Gresham and into Boring.  Metro has proposed constructing the Cazadero Trail which would extend that spur  past Estacada for eventual connection to the Pacific Crest Trail.

See also 
 Mount Tabor, another park included in the Olmsted plan

References 

Parks in Portland, Oregon
Rail trails in Oregon
Transportation in Portland, Oregon
Bike paths in Oregon